Vasko DimitrovskI (born 9 October 1982) is a retired Macedonian handball player.

References 
 http://www.eurohandball.com/ec/cl/men/2005-06/player/521398/Vasko+Dimitrovski
 http://www.ehfcl.com/men/2014-15/player/521398/Vasko+Dimitrovski

1982 births
Living people
Macedonian male handball players
Sportspeople from Bitola